Heart-hand syndrome, Slovenian type is a rare autosomal dominant genetic disorder belonging to the heart-hand syndromes.

Signs and symptoms 

Individuals with this condition typically exhibit progressive heart conduction disease, tachycardia, arrhythmia, dilated cardiomyopathy which begins during a patient's adulthood and congenital (from birth) minor physical anomalies such as clinodactyly, syndactyly and brachydactyly that affects the feet more than the hands.

Complications 

There are various complications associated with this syndrome, these are (but are not limited to):

Sudden death associated with the cardiac problems characteristic of this condition.

Pain while walking, self-consciousness/insecurity of one's foot associated with the brachymetatarsia characteristic of this condition.

Self insecurity (sometimes) associated with brachydactyly

Genetics 

This condition is caused by a splice site mutation in the LMNA gene, located in chromosome 1. This mutation is inherited following an autosomal dominant manner.

Diagnosis 

There are various methods of diagnosis, some of them are:

Genetic testing/sequencing 

In 2008, Renou et al. sequenced the LMNA gene of 12 members of the Slovenian family desvribed by Sinkovec et al. and by doing this they identified a splice site mutation that was not found in 100 healthy control subjects without this type of heart-hand syndrome.

Radiographs 

When radiograph, members of the Slovenian family reported by Sinkovec et al. were found to have various radiographic anomalies, these included the duplication of the second metatarsal's bases, terminal phalange symphalangism of the toes, extra foot ossicles, brachyphalangy, etc.

Electrocardiogram 

Abnormal heart beats can be diagnosed through electrocardiograms.

Prevalence 

According to OMIM, only 21 cases from 2 Slovenian and Irish/German Canadian families have been described in medical literature.

History 

This condition was first discovered in 2005 by Sinkovec et al. when they described 10 members belonging to a 4-generation Slovenian family with progressive sinoatrial and atrioventricular conduction disease, ventricular tachyarrhythmia-associated sudden death, dilated cardiomyopathy, and a unique type of brachydactyly which affected the hands to a lesser extent than it affected the feet, it involved the following symptoms:

Hands 

 Generalized brachyphalangy that affected all 3 of the phalanges of the fingers alongside clinodactyly.

Feet 

 Brachyphalangy of the distal and proximal phalanges of the toes

 Hypoplastic or aplastic middle phalanges of the toes

 Brachymetatarsia

 Terminal symphalangism

 duplication of the bases of the second metatarsals

 extra ossicles

 Toe syndactyly.

Eponym 

This condition's name originates from the fact that the first family described in medical literature with this association of symptoms was from Slovenia.

See also 

Heart-hand syndromes
Heart-hand syndrome, Spanish type
Brachydactyly-long thumb syndrome
Brachydactyly
Brachymetatarsia
Minor physical anomalies
Congenital heart defects

References 

Rare syndromes